Ockley railway station serves the villages of Ockley and Capel in Surrey, England and is  from Ockley village and  west of the village of Capel. Ockley is managed by Southern which also provide the services.

History
It opened as Ockley & Capel on 1 May 1867 as part of the London Brighton & South Coast Railway extension to Horsham. Its situation next to Le Steeres of Jayes Park brickworks (closed c 1914) and nearby Phorpres Works (now Clockhouse Works) allowed for substantial brickwork traffic for many years. Milk traffic was also important until the early 1930s when this trade was lost to road transport.

Goods traffic declined slowly over the next 30 years ceasing finally in June 1962.

In 2000 the station was Grade II listed.

A great deal of further detail on the history of this station and the entire section of line between Dorking and Horsham can be found in John Harrod's Up The Dorking.

Services

All services at Ockley are operated by Southern using  EMUs.

The typical off-peak service in trains per hour is:
 1 tph to  via 
 1 tph to 

During the peak hours, the service is increased to 2 tph. There is no service on Saturday evenings (after approximately 18:30) or on Sundays.

Facilities
The station has parking for around 17 cars (15 normal spaces and two disabled) in the Station Approach. There is no taxi rank. There is a BT payphone in front of the station building. There are no buses that serve the station itself.

Journey times
Journey times now vary between 63 and 76 minutes to London Victoria compared to times of between only 51 and 60 minutes as recently as 1992.

References

External links 

Railway stations in Surrey
Former London, Brighton and South Coast Railway stations
Railway stations in Great Britain opened in 1867
Railway stations served by Govia Thameslink Railway